Niban-like protein 2.(NLP2) is a protein that in humans is encoded by the FAM129C gene. Paralogs of this gene include FAM129A, and FAM129B. Its aliases include B-Cell Novel Protein 1 (BCNP1), and Family with Sequence Similarity 129 Member C (FAM129C).

Gene

The FAM129C gene is 30,538 base pairs long and is mapped to 19p.13.112 on chromosome 19 (NC_000019.10) from 17523301 to 17553839 in humans. Chromosome 19 has highest gene density of all human chromosomes and large clustered gene families corresponding to high G + C content, CpG islands, and high-density repetitive DNA suggest evolutionary significance for genes located here. Based on location and expression of FAM129C gene, this would suggest it has a role in immune system function.

Gene conservation
True orthologs of FAM129C seem to be highly conserved in mammals, reptiles, marsupials, bony and cartilaginous fish. The most distant ortholog of FAM129C were found to be in a cellular slime mould, Polysphondyllum pallidum, and even a species of barley, Hordeum vulgare.

Gene Expression

In normal tissues, the highest expression was in lymph, bone marrow, and spleen tissue, with low expression in other parts of the human body. FAM129C contains pleckstrin homology domain that may cause the protein to associate with the plasma membrane. It is expressed in early stages of B-cell differentiation, and in high levels in chronic lymphocytic leukemia, and in the activated subtype of diffuse large B-cell lymphoma. FAM129C is mainly expressed in the cytoplasm. The pattern of expression is similar to that of CXCR4, so may be involved in B cell development and B cell maturation during germinal center reaction.

In the human GEO profile, FAM129C appears to be expressed at lower levels in tissues with dilated cardiomyopathy by almost 50% when compared to non-failing septum tissue. This may mean that FAM129C plays a role in non-failing heart tissue. Another condition in which FAM129C is significantly down-regulated is with the wild-type genotype hippocampal tissue of Rubinstein-Taybi compared with the p300 +/- genotype. People with this condition have an increased risk of developing noncancerous and cancerous tumors such as leukemia and lymphoma

Protein
The isoelectric point of NLP2 is 8.576000. The molecular weight is 77.4 kdal. The  amino acid sequence is 697aa long

Structure 
The predicted tertiary structure for NLP2 shows the FAM129C PH domain. There are seven predicted β sheets at the N terminus. This will form the tertiary structure of the pleckstrin homology domain.

Protein Post-Modification
Transmembrane domains, peptide cleavage sites, or strong glycosylation sites were not predicted for NLP2. A total of 32 likely phosphorylation sites were predicted on Serine (25,) Threonine (5), and Tyrosine (2).

References

Human proteins